Spermophilus is a genus of ground squirrels in the squirrel family. As traditionally defined the genus was very species-rich, ranging through Europe, Asia and North America, but this arrangement was found to be paraphyletic to the certainly distinct prairie dogs, marmots, and antelope squirrels. As a consequence, all the former Spermophilus species of North America have been moved to other genera, leaving the European and Asian species as true Spermophilus (the only exceptions are two Asian Urocitellus).

Some species are sometimes called susliks (or sousliks). This name comes from Russian суслик, suslik. In some languages, a derivative of the name is in common usage, for example suseł in Polish. The scientific name of this genus means "seed-lovers" (gr. σπέρμα sperma, genitive σπέρματος spermatos – seed; φίλος philos – friend, lover).

Habitat and behavior
As typical ground squirrels, Spermophilus live in open habitats like grasslands, meadows, steppe and semideserts, feed on the low plants, and use burrows as nests and refuge. They are diurnal and mostly live in colonies, although some species also can occur singly. They are found in both lowlands to highlands, hibernate during the colder months (up to  8 months each year in some species) and in arid regions they may also aestivate during the summer or fall. The distributions of the various species are mostly separated, often by large rivers, although there are regions inhabited by as many as three species and rarely two species may even form mixed colonies. A few species are known to hybridize where their ranges come into contact.

Appearance
Spermophilus are overall yellowish, light orangish, light brownish or greyish. Although many are inconspicuously mottled or spotted, or have orange markings on the head, overall they lack strong patterns, except in S. suslicus, which commonly has brown upperparts with clear white spotting. All have a fairly short tail that—depending on exact species—is around 10–45% of the length of the head-and-body.

Relationship with humans
Ground squirrels may carry fleas that transmit diseases to humans (see Black Death), and have been destructive in tunneling underneath human habitation.

Species 

A generic revision was undertaken in 2007 by means of phylogenetic analyses using the mitochondrial gene cytochrome b. This resulted in the splitting of Spermophilus into eight genera, which with the prairie dogs, marmots, and antelope squirrels are each given as numbered clades. The exact relations between the clades are slightly unclear. Among these, these exclusively Palearctic species are retained as the genus Spermophilus sensu stricto (in the strictest sense).

 Spermophilus sensu stricto, Old World ground squirrels
 Alashan ground squirrel, Spermophilus alashanicus
 Brandt's ground squirrel, Spermophilus brevicauda
 European ground squirrel, Spermophilus citellus
 Daurian ground squirrel, Spermophilus dauricus
 Red-cheeked ground squirrel, Spermophilus erythrogenys
 Yellow ground squirrel, Spermophilus fulvus
 Russet ground squirrel, Spermophilus major
 Caucasian Mountain ground squirrel, Spermophilus musicus
 Tian Shan ground squirrel, Spermophilus nilkaensis
 Pallid ground squirrel, Spermophilus pallidicauda
 Little ground squirrel, Spermophilus pygmaeus
 Relict ground squirrel, Spermophilus relictus
 Speckled ground squirrel, Spermophilus suslicus
 Taurus ground squirrel, Spermophilus taurensis
 Asia Minor ground squirrel, Spermophilus xanthoprymnus

Prehistoric species
Discovery and examination of one of the best preserved Eurasian ground squirrel fossils yet recovered allowed the study of many previously unknown aspects of ground squirrel cranial anatomy, and prompted a critical reassessment of their phylogenetic position. As a result, three Pleistocene species previously considered members of the Urocitellus genus were moved to Spermophilus:

 †Spermophilus nogaici
 †Spermophilus polonicus
 †Spermophilus primigenius

Spermophilus citelloides is known from the Middle Pleistocene to early Holocene of Europe. It appears to be most closely related to the living S. suslicus.

References

External links 

 
Rodents of Europe
Mammals of North America
Mammals of Asia
Rodent genera
Taxa named by Frédéric Cuvier